Charles Brooker (March 25, 1932 – December 18, 2020) was a Canadian ice hockey player who competed in the 1956 Winter Olympics.

Brooker was a member of the Kitchener-Waterloo Dutchmen who won the bronze medal for Canada in ice hockey at the 1956 Winter Olympics.

Brooker died on 18 December 2020 at the age of 88.

References

External links

 Charlie Brooker's profile at Sports Reference.com

1932 births
2020 deaths
Canadian ice hockey left wingers
Ice hockey players at the 1956 Winter Olympics
Medalists at the 1956 Winter Olympics
Olympic bronze medalists for Canada
Olympic ice hockey players of Canada